The Gwna Group is a late Precambrian (Ediacaran) / Cambrian lithostratigraphic group (a sequence of rock strata) in northwest Wales. The name is derived from the Afon Gwna, a river near Bodorgan on Anglesey where the strata are exposed. This rock sequence is also commonly referred to as the Gwna Mélange.

Outcrops
These rocks are exposed across various parts of Anglesey and along the northern coast of Llŷn and at Bardsey Island. The extensive coastal cliffs at each of these locations affords excellent exposure.

Lithology and stratigraphy
The Group is considered to represent the result of an olistostrome, a giant underwater gravity slide, which occurred probably as a result of tectonic activity at some time after 614 million years ago. It includes clasts, at all sizes from millimetres up to a kilometre or more, of a diverse range of both sedimentary and igneous rocks. Since deposition the group as a whole has been subject to low grade metamorphism.

References

Precambrian Europe
Cambrian System of Europe
Geology of Wales
Geological groups of the United Kingdom